William "Hammy" Howell (24 October 1954 – 13 January 1999) was a British piano and keyboard blues and boogie-woogie player, who played for the then-popular doo wop outfit, Darts.

Born in London, England, Howell became attracted to the piano at an early age. He was nicknamed "Hammy" for keeping pet hamsters (later rats). He entered the Wennington School in 1966, graduating in 1973.

After leaving school, Howell developed his own distinctive style of piano playing, starting with blues, then rock and roll and eventually boogie-woogie.

In the 1970s, he backed Johnny Mars, a popular American electric blues harmonica player, singer, and songwriter who had relocated to Britain. Mars and his Oakland Boogie Band frequently visited Germany where they became popular among blues fans.

Howell then joined the Darts (which evolved from Rocky Sharpe and the Razors) and stayed with them, on and off, through the 1980s.

After his mother's illness and death in the 1980s, he began suffering from health issues. During this period he occasionally taught piano, and at one point came to young Brendan Kavanagh's home to give him three free boogie-woogie lessons. Kavanagh today credits Howell as his boogie-woogie mentor.

Howell died of heart failure at age 44 in Torquay, Devon, on 13 January 1999.

References

1954 births
1999 deaths
Boogie-woogie pianists
Boogie-woogie musicians
British blues pianists
British male pianists
Musicians from London
20th-century British male musicians